Elizabeth Harden Gilmore House, also known as Minotti-Gilmore House or Harden and Harden Funeral Home, is a historic home and national historic district located at Charleston, West Virginia. It is a -story, Classical Revival brick detached residential dwelling built by 1900 on an approximately one-half acre lot in a business area of town.  It features a columned portico and has undergone some alteration and deterioration.  It was the home and location of a funeral home operated by Elizabeth Gilmore, a prominent African American in the Kanawha Valley.

It was listed on the National Register of Historic Places in 1988.

References

African-American history of West Virginia
Houses in Charleston, West Virginia
Neoclassical architecture in West Virginia
Historic districts in Charleston, West Virginia
Houses completed in 1900
Houses on the National Register of Historic Places in West Virginia
National Register of Historic Places in Charleston, West Virginia
Historic districts on the National Register of Historic Places in West Virginia